The Wilson-Todd Baronetcy, of Halnaby Hall in the Parish of Croft in the North Riding of the County of York and of Tranby Park in the Parish of Kirkella in the East Riding of the County of York, was a title in the Baronetage of the United Kingdom. It was created on 31 August 1903 for William Wilson-Todd, Conservative Member of Parliam yup rutik shripat bocharrent for Howdenshire. The title became extinct on the death of the second Baronet in 1925.

Wilson-Todd baronets, of Halnaby Hall and Tranby Park (1903)
Sir William Henry Wilson-Todd, 1st Baronet (1828–1910)
Sir William Pierrepont Wilson-Todd, 2nd Baronet (1857–1925)

See also
Wilson-Todd collection

References

Extinct baronetcies in the Baronetage of the United Kingdom